Sunday Drivers is a 1982 supplement for Car Wars published by Steve Jackson Games.

Gameplay
Sunday Drivers presents Car Wars urban combat in which a small town, Midville, is beset by warring factions of duelists, a pedestrian defense group, a cycle gang, and the law.

Reception
Craig Sheeley reviewed Sunday Drivers in The Space Gamer No. 62. Sheeley commented that "Car Wars enthusiasts: If all you want is arena and road combat, don't bother to get Sunday Drivers. However, if you want to go beyond the arena, this game is worth the [money] – and much more".

GeekDad wrote that Sunday Drivers would "allow us to lose the straight streets in lieu of a full-on mini-town, complete with houses, a park, tons of intersections, and if memory serves a police station with cruisers loaded and ready to take on any marauders who might want to add some excitement to the streets of quiet little Midville."

References

Car Wars